The 1960–61 Illinois Fighting Illini men's basketball team represented the University of Illinois.

Regular season
Head coach Harry Combes experienced the worst record of his 20 years at the University of Illinois. His Fighting Illini basketball team, for the second year in a row, played in a mid-season tournament.  The tournament they would compete in would be the Kentucky Invitational Tournament held at Memorial Coliseum in Lexington, Kentucky December 21–22.

The 1960-61 team utilized several returning lettermen including the leading scorer and team "MVP" Dave Downey. It also saw the return of Jerry Colangelo, John Wessels, Bill Burwell, Bill Small, as well as Doug Mills. The Illini also added sophomore Bob Starnes to their lineup. The Illini finished the season with a conference record of 5 wins and 9 losses, finishing 7th in the Big Ten. They would finish with an overall record of 9 wins and 15 losses.  The starting lineup included Bill Burwell at the center position, Bill Small and Jerry Colangelo at guard and Dave Downey and John Wessels at the forward slots.

Roster

Source

Schedule
												
Source																
												

|-
!colspan=12 style="background:#DF4E38; color:white;"| Non-Conference regular season
	
							

|-
!colspan=9 style="background:#DF4E38; color:#FFFFFF;"|Big Ten regular season

|-

Player stats

Awards and honors
Dave Downey
Converse Honorable Mention All-American
Team Most Valuable Player 
John Wessels
Converse Honorable Mention All-American

Team players drafted into the NBA

Rankings

References

Illinois Fighting Illini
Illinois Fighting Illini men's basketball seasons
1960 in sports in Illinois
1961 in sports in Illinois